Canadian Arctic
 Fjords of Canada
 Glaciers of Canada
 Great Lakes
 Mountain peaks of Canada
 Appalachian Mountains
 Pacific Cordillera
 List of mountains in Canada
 List of volcanoes in Canada
 Prairies of Canada
 Rivers of Canada
 List of islands of Canada
 List of lakes in Canada
 Extreme points of Canada
 List of waterfalls in Canada
 Valleys of Canada
 World Heritage Sites in Canada
 Other
 Canadian Shield
 St. Lawrence Lowlands